Michel Hausmann is a Venezuelan-born theater director, writer, and producer. He is the co-founder and artistic director of Miami New Drama, the resident theater company and operator of the Colony Theatre in Miami Beach. Under Hausmann's leadership, the company has produced over a dozen productions - nine of them world premieres. Michel Hausmann also started Miami New Drama's educational program, which serves more than 8,000 students annually and provides online programming for people across the United States and internationally - offering master classes on a variety of different theater topics such as acting, playwriting, directing, and theater management.

Biography 
Hausmann is of Jewish descent, and was born and raised in Caracas, Venezuela. After graduating from Emerson College in Boston, Massachusetts with a BA in film, Hausmann returned to Caracas. Once back, he founded his first theater company, Palo de Agua, in 2003 alongside executive producer, Yair Rosemberg. Under their leadership, Palo de Agua became an award-winning theater company. Its production of Jesus Christ Superstar was seen by over 170,000 people. Following an attack by the Venezuelan government during the production, Michel Hausmann left Venezuela and moved to New York City to pursue an MFA in Directing at Columbia University. While at Columbia, Hausmann studied under renowned directors such as Anne Bogart and Gregory Mosher, among others. His thesis play, The Golem of Havana, played at La MaMa Experimental Theatre Club in 2013 and went on to have its world premiere at Barrington Stage Company in 2014. 

In 2016, Hausmann relocated to Miami, Florida and produced The Golem of Havana at the Colony Theatre in Miami Beach; it was Miami New Drama's debut production. Miami New Drama is the second theater company founded by Michel Hausmann. He co-founded it with playwright, director, and medal of the arts winner, Moisés Kaufman. In 2020, Miami New Drama produced Seven Deadly Sins: Temptation in the Magic City, a series of seven short plays around the theme of the seven deadly sins, shown in vacant Miami storefronts along Lincoln Road while the limited audience, socially distanced due to Coronavirus restrictions, watches and listens via headphones. The production was directed by Hausmann and authored by playwrights Hilary Bettis, Nilo Cruz, Moisés Kaufman, Rogelio Martinez, Dael Orlandersmith, Carmen Palaez, and Aurin Squire.

Stage Directing & Producing Credits

Credits with Miami New Drama 

 The Golem of Havana (Book by Hausmann himself, music by Salomon Lerner, and lyrics by Len Schiff) - Director and Producer
 A Special Day (in co-production with The Play Company) - Producer
 Terror (Directed by Gregory Mosher) - Producer

 The first multilingual production of Our Town - Director and Producer
 The Elaborate Entrance of Chad Deity (In co-production with Asolo Rep) - Producer
 Hilary Bettis' Queen of Basel - Director and Producer
 Moises Kaufman's The Album (in co-production with Tectonic Theater Project) - Producer
 Puras Cosas Maravillosas (starring Erika de la Vega) - Director and Producer
 Kemp Powers' One Night in Miami - Producer
 The world premiere of Carmen Pelaez's Fake - Producer
 The world premiere of Billy Corben and Aurin Squire's Confessions of a Cocaine Cowboy - Director and Producer
 The world premiere of Viva la Parranda - Producer
 The world premiere of Karin Valecillos' Gente Ociosa - Director and Producer
 The Bridge of San Luis Rey (Directed by and starring David Greenspan) - Producer
 The world premiere of Michael Leon's The Cubans - Producer
 The world premiere of A Wonderful World (Book by Aurin Squire, with music made famous by Louis Armstrong, directed by Christopher Renshaw) - Producer

Off-Broadway Credits 

 The 2013 production of The Golem Of Havana at La MaMa Experimental Theatre Club - Director

 Nilo Cruz'sThe Color Of Desire at Repertorio Español - Director
 Vassily Sigarev's Black Milk at Classic Stage Company- Director

Notable Credits with Palo de Agua in Venezuela 

 The world premiere of Isaac Chocrón's Los Navegaos - Director
 The Venezuelan premiere of Gross Indecency: The Three Trials of Oscar Wilde - Co-director
 Fiddler on the Roof - Director and Translator
 The Producers - Director and Translator
 Jesus Christ Superstar - Director and Translator

Awards 

 New York Theatre Workshop 2050 Fellow
 Shubert Presidential Fellow
 IRNE Award (Nomination)
 Richard Rodgers Award (Finalist)
 Two-time Knight Foundation Arts Challenge Award Recipient

Conflicts with the Venezuelan government 
During Hausmann's 2009 production of Fiddler on the Roof, the Grand Marshal of Ayacucho Symphony Orchestra, funded in its entirety by the Venezuelan government of President Hugo Chávez, abandoned the production two weeks before the opening, citing that its participation on a "Jewish play" would threaten the funding they receive from the Venezuelan government, a vocal foe of Israel. The move was condemned by the Simon Wiesenthal Center and the Anti Defamation League. The production went forward, performed on a rooftop in Caracas with various musicians stepping up to play the score.

When preparing for a 2010 production of Jesus Christ Superstar in Caracas, Hausmann secured a sponsorship deal for US$300,000 with Research in Motion (RIM), makers of BlackBerry smartphones, and its cellular phone network partner, government-owned Movilnet. Official documents released by WikiLeaks revealed that, less than a month before opening night, the sponsorship pair added a clause stating that the production could not place advertising spaceeven with other cashin a list of media outlets banned by RIM and Movilnet for being critical of the Chávez regime. Hausmann and producer Yair Rosemberg chose instead to cancel the RIM-Movilnet sponsorship deal, and went public with this information. When the production opened at the Central University of Venezuela, it was attacked with tear gas by masked assailants. While the rector of the university stated that the attack was a continuation of incidents targeting the university, Hausmann called it an example of Chávez' intimidation against any theatre group branded enemies of the state "because they seek to maintain their autonomy".

References

External links 
 Producciones Palo de Agua Sitio Oficial
 Repertorio Español
Interview with Michel Hausmann, November 21, 2018

Living people
Venezuelan Jews
Venezuelan people of German-Jewish descent
People of Belgian-Jewish descent
Year of birth missing (living people)
Venezuelan dramatists and playwrights
Emerson College alumni
Columbia University School of the Arts alumni